Hare-abian Nights is a 1959 Warner Bros. Merrie Melodies cartoon directed by Ken Harris of Chuck Jones' unit. The short was released on February 28, 1959, and stars Bugs Bunny. The cartoon was animated by Harris and Ben Washam and recycles footage from Bully for Bugs, Water, Water Every Hare, and Sahara Hare. Hare-abian Nights is a pun on Arabian Nights.

Hare-abian Nights is the only short in the Golden Age of American animation starring Yosemite Sam not directed by Friz Freleng or a member of Freleng's unit, although sequences from a Freleng cartoon are used in this short.

The plot of this cartoon inspired the 1982 feature Bugs Bunny's 3rd Movie: 1001 Rabbit Tales.

Plot 
In an Arabian palace (similar to the gong show in I Love to Singa), the short opens with atheband Timbuk Two Plus 3 playing "Sweet Georgia Brown" trying to entertain the sultan, with the performance ending with the floor being dropped out from under them, sending the band into a crocodile pit below. Next, a musician (A caricature of Elvis Presley) scared by the fate of Timbuk Two performs "Hound Camel" (a send-up of "Hound Dog") before meeting the same fate as Timbuk Two. Following that, Bugs, intending to travel to Perth Amboy but having missed a left turn at Des Moines, ends up in front of other prospective performers and is ordered to entertain the sultan.

Assigned the role of "Teller of Tales", Bugs proceeds to tell his tale of how he ended up in the palace. Flashing back to 1953's Bully for Bugs, Bugs recounts his problems with a bull he met at a bullfighting ring while trying to find the Coachella Valley, and Bugs' outsmarting the bull with a hidden anvil. The sultan is prepared to press the button to send Bugs into the pit, but then Bugs recounts his experiences with Rudolph the monster in 1952's Water, Water Every Hare, where Bugs impersonates a hairdresser to outsmart Rudolph. Bugs also recounts his encounter with Yosemite Sam in the Sahara Desert in 1955's Sahara Hare, referring to Sam as "the stupidest character of them all", while recounting Sam's unsuccessful attempts to enter a desert fort.

At this point, while Bugs is chuckling at Sam's misfortunes in the desert, the Sultan, who turns out to be none other than Yosemite Sam himself, tries to press the button to drop Bugs, only to find that Bugs has shut off the master switch, frustrating Sam. When Sam tries to find out what is wrong, Bugs resets the master switch, dropping Sam into the crocodile pit, from which he escapes, but not before one of the crocodiles also escapes, sending Sam running off. Bugs, now dressed with turbans covering each ear, describes Sam's act as a "don't call us, we'll call you" act, along with some other remarks as the camera irises out.

See also 
List of Bugs Bunny cartoons
List of Yosemite Sam cartoons

References

External links 

1959 films
1959 animated films
1959 short films
Merrie Melodies short films
Films directed by Ken Harris
Films scored by Milt Franklyn
Films set in deserts
Films set in palaces
Films set in the Middle East
Clip shows
Bugs Bunny films
1950s Warner Bros. animated short films
Films with screenplays by Michael Maltese
Yosemite Sam films